Dios Nunca Muere is a Mexican waltz written by composer and violinist Macedonio Alcalá in 1868. Is the de facto anthem of the state of Oaxaca. Dios Nunca Muere has been sung by famous singers like Pedro Infante and Javier Solís.
 
There are two versions of the creation of this waltz. The first says that was composed when Macedonio Alcala and his wife went through a precarious economic situation and also the composer was at risk of dying, then his friend Roberto Maqueo, seeing their plight, left him without him noticing 12 pesos in silver. The other version says that some Indigenous people from a nearby village visited him to ask for a waltz for the patron of his people, and paid 12 pesos in silver. It is said that when Alcalá received the money, sat on his bed and drew on a wall the first bars of the waltz, which later transcribed on paper; He called this waltz Dios Nunca Muere in gratitude that he had received help when he needed.

To this composition has been assigned several lyrics from which the best known, was written in 1955 by Vicente Garrido Calderón.

Lyrics

See also 
 Oaxaca

References

External links 

 México Desconocido, Dios nunca muere

Oaxaca
Spanish-language songs
1868 songs